Michael Rabušic (born 17 September 1989) is a Czech professional footballer who currently plays for Slovan Liberec in the Czech First League.

Club career

FC Slovan Liberec
In June 2011, Rabušic together with his Zbrojovka Brno teammate Josef Šural signed a three-year contract with Czech First League side Slovan Liberec. He remained at Liberec for three years, where he was the top scorer for the club in the first half of the 2013–14 season with four goals. He subsequently joined Italian side Verona on 31 January 2014, the club managing to register him before the midnight league deadline.

Hellas Verona
After his arrival he didn't play regularly, appearing only in four league matches. In August 2014 he was loaned to second league side A.C. Perugia Calcio and in January 2015 he was loaned to second league side F.C. Crotone. In July 2015 he was loaned to Czech first league side Slovan Liberec.

Szombathelyi Haladás
On 15 February 2018 Rabušic joined Hungarian side Szombathelyi Haladás, coached by former Vysočina Jihlava coach Michal Hipp.

International career
Rabušic was a member of the Czech under-21 team, He represented the team at the 2011 UEFA European Under-21 Football Championship. He also has three start for the senior national team.

Honors
Czech Republic U21 
UEFA European Under-21 Championship bronze: 2011

Slovan Liberec
Gambrinus liga: 2011–12

References

External links
 

1989 births
Living people
Czech footballers
Czech Republic international footballers
Czech Republic youth international footballers
Czech Republic under-21 international footballers
Czech First League players
Serie A players
Serie B players
FC Vysočina Jihlava players
FC Zbrojovka Brno players
FC Slovan Liberec players
SK Dynamo České Budějovice players
Hellas Verona F.C. players
A.C. Perugia Calcio players
F.C. Crotone players
Czech expatriate footballers
Expatriate footballers in Italy
People from Náměšť nad Oslavou
Association football forwards
Szombathelyi Haladás footballers
Expatriate footballers in Hungary
Czech expatriate sportspeople in Hungary
Czech expatriate sportspeople in Italy
Sportspeople from the Vysočina Region